The Asia/Oceania Zone was the unique zone within Group 3 of the regional Davis Cup competition in 2022. The zone's competition was held in round robin format in Tây Ninh, Vietnam, from 10 to 13 August 2022.

Participating nations

Draw
Date: 10–13 August 2022

Location: Hai Dang Tennis Club, Tây Ninh, Vietnam (hard)

Format: Round-robin basis. Two pools of two teams. Two pools of four teams and nations will play each team once in their group. The two group winners will automatically earn promotion to the World Group II play-offs in 2022. The two second-placed teams will fight for the third remaining promotion spot. The four teams finishing in third and last place will fight to avoid relegation to Asia/Oceania Group IV.

Seeding

 1Davis Cup Rankings as of 7 March 2022

Round Robin

Pool A

Pool B

Standings are determined by: 1. number of wins; 2. number of matches; 3. in two-team ties, head-to-head records; 4. in three-team ties, (a) percentage of sets won (head-to-head records if two teams remain tied), then (b) percentage of games won (head-to-head records if two teams remain tied), then (c) Davis Cup rankings.

Playoffs

 ,  and  qualify for the 2023 Davis Cup World Group II Play-offs

Round Robin

Pool A

Vietnam vs. Jordan

Syria vs. Malaysia

Vietnam vs. Malaysia

Syria vs. Jordan

Vietnam vs. Syria

Jordan vs. Malaysia

Pool B

Pacific Oceania vs. Iran

Saudi Arabia vs. United Arab Emirates

Pacific Oceania vs. United Arab Emirates

Saudi Arabia vs. Iran

Pacific Oceania vs. Saudi Arabia

Iran vs. United Arab Emirates

Play-offs

1st place play-off

Vietnam vs. Pacific Oceania

Promotion play-off

Jordan vs. Saudi Arabia

Relegation play-offs

Malaysia vs. United Arab Emirates

Syria vs. Iran

References

External links
Official Website

Davis Cup Asia/Oceania Zone
Asia/Oceania Zone